McKenzie's Tourist Services is a bus operator in Melbourne, Australia. It operates five routes under contract to Public Transport Victoria. It is a subsidiary of the Dineen Group.

History
In 1927, Lorry McKenzie commenced operating a service in Healesville after purchasing a Packard car when on a trip to Sydney. McKenzie had this car elongated and began transporting people. They then purchased some smaller buses and continued to operate their service. In September 2006, McKenzie's Tourist Services was sold to the Dineen Group.

Fleet
As at November 2022, the fleet consisted of 57 buses and coaches.

References

External links

Company website

Bus companies of Victoria (Australia)
Bus transport in Melbourne
Transport companies established in 1927
1927 establishments in Australia